Kevin Thoms (born July 4, 1979) is an American actor, perhaps best known for providing the voice for Lance in Cartoon Network's Sym-Bionic Titan. Prior to this role, he has been cast in many films and television series including Riding In Cars With Boys, Ed, Law and Order: Special Victims Unit, as either main roles or minor roles. He has also had a few other voice roles in Star Wars: The Clone Wars, Fusion Fall (as Lance), Aion, and other video game and animated series.

Filmography

References

1979 births
Living people
American male film actors
American male television actors
American male voice actors
Male actors from New York (state)
People from Long Island
People from Smithtown, New York